Kerwin Andrés Calderón Vargas (born 2 January 2002) is a Colombian footballer who plays as a forward for Charlotte FC in Major League Soccer.

Club career
Born in a small village in Concordia, Magdalena, Colombia, Vargas started his career with Cundy FC, before moving to CA Santa Marta at the age of nine. He left for a short spell with Boca Juniors de Cali at the age of 15, but returned to CA Santa Marta, who were later renamed Academia Europea.

After trialling with numerous top teams across Europe, he moved to Portugal in 2020, and signed for Feirense.

Career statistics

Club

Notes

References

2002 births
Living people
Sportspeople from Magdalena Department
Colombian footballers
Association football forwards
Liga Portugal 2 players
Major League Soccer players
Boca Juniors de Cali footballers
C.D. Feirense players
Charlotte FC players
Colombian expatriate footballers
Colombian expatriate sportspeople in Portugal
Expatriate footballers in Portugal